Făt-Frumos with the Golden Hair (Romanian: Făt-Frumos cu părul de aur) or The Foundling Prince is a Romanian fairy tale collected by Petre Ispirescu in Legende sau basmele românilor. The tale was also published the title Fet-Frumosu cu perulu de auru, both by author  and Romanian folklorist Atanasie Marian Marienescu in newspaper Albina (ro).

Synopsis

A hermit lived alone.  One day, a box floated down the river to him.  It contained a beautiful boy child, Făt-Frumos, and a letter saying that his mother was a king's daughter who had erred and done this out of fear of her parents.  A grape vine sprung up in his hut, and with its fruit, he was able to feed the child.  When he was grown, the hermit died, telling him that a lion would come to dig his grave, and that he should take the horse reins in the attic, which, if he shook, would bring him a horse.  He did as his foster father said.  The horse gave him clothing, and he rode off.  At the horse's direction, he took service with three fairies.  The horse told him that every seven years, their bathroom had a flow of gold that would turn anyone's hair gold; it also had a chest with three magnificent suits of clothing.  One day, the fairies went to a party but directed him to summon them back if the gold started to flow.  It did.  The horse directed him to bathe in it himself and take the clothes.  He did, and they escaped the fairies.  

He hid his hair and got a job working for a gardener for a king.  One day, the king's oldest daughter arranged for herself and her sisters to bring melons to the king:  hers was overripe, her next sister's was ripe, the youngest's was just about ripe.  His councilors explained that the oldest should have been married already, the next was ready for marriage, and even the youngest daughter was nearly ready.  Suitors came for them, and the oldest was married to a prince.  The wedding procession set out from the castle; only the youngest princess stayed behind.  Făt-Frumos loosed his hair, put on the suit like a flowering meadow, and rode his horse over the garden.  It did much damage, but the princess was enchanted with him.  The gardener was angry, but the princess gave him gold and told him not to beat the boy.  When the second sister married, the youngest princess stayed behind, the boy loosed his hair, wore a suit like the starry night and rode his horse, ruining the garden; the youngest princess bribed the gardener with two handfuls of gold not to beat him.  The king had a feast at his hunting lodge; again the youngest princess did not go, and Făt-Frumos loosed his hair, wore a suit with the sun, the moon, and stars, and ruined the garden so badly that weeks did not restore it.  The youngest princess bribed the gardener with three handfuls of gold.

The king saw how his youngest daughter was always sad.  His councilors suggested that all the princes and nobles should walk under the gate, and whoever the princess dropped a golden apple to would be her husband.  They all walked, but she did not drop the apple.  Then all the servants, last of all the bald undergardener, as Făt-Frumos appeared.  She dropped the apple to him.  The king refused, but after three times, she had dropped the apple to him every time.  They married quietly and the king gave them a hut in a distant corner of his courtyard.

The princes who had wooed her were offended and banded together to attack her father.  His sons-in-law raised armies to come to his aid.  Făt-Frumos said he would do the same, but his father-in-law jeered at him, finally let him come only as a water carrier.  But out of sight, Făt-Frumos changed into the clothes he had stolen from the fairies and came to the king's aid.  The forces attacked three times, and the third, Făt-Frumos was wounded.  The king gave him a handkerchief to bind his wounds.

The king began to go blind.  It was learned that only the milk of red wild goats would cure him.  His sons-in-law set out to find it.  Făt-Frumos found the goats and got the milk, and offered to sell some to his brothers-in-law if they would let him brand them as his slaves.  They agreed, thinking they could escape, but only Făt-Frumos's milk restored the king's sight.

At the banquet, Făt-Frumos revealed that he had branded the other two kings as his slaves and was the hero who had helped the king's army.  The king demanded that he reappear as he appeared then. When Făt-Frumos did so, he gave up his throne to Făt-Frumos. The first thing Făt-Frumos did was free his brothers-in-law.

Translations
The tale was also translated from the original Romanian into English with the title The Hermit's Foundling with the Golden Hair; Prince Charming, the Golden-Haired, and Lad-Handsome with the Golden Hair.

Analysis

Tale type
Romanian scholars classify the tale as type 314 of the international Aarne-Thompson-Uther Index. In tale type ATU 314, "Goldener", the hero enters the service of a sorcerer or another magical being, and finds a horse that warns him about the danger his benefactor poses. The hero then flees with the horse to another kingdom, where he hides his golden hair (hence the name of the type) under a cap and finds work as a king's gardener.

Variants 
Author Petre Ispirescu collected the tale Făt-Frumos cel rătăcit ("Făt-Frumos, The Lost One"), from a teller in Craiova. In this tale, a poor working couple feeds their mare, and longs to have a son. One day, they wander of until they finds a sorcerer who gives them an apple, but warns them that the apple must not be shared with any animal. They go back home and eat the apple, and leave the peels on the yard which their mare eats. Nine months later, a boy is born to the human couple, and a foal to the mare. The old man is glad to have been doubly blessed and allows his son to keep the horse. The boy grows up fast and becomes too strong and smart, and, one day, rides the horse at a very fast pace away from his parents' farm. The couple try to find him, but he is too far away to be seen, so they weep for their vanished son. Meanwhile, the boy reaches a distant place and feels he is unable to retrace his tracks, and cries over the situation. The horse tries to comfort him, and gives him its bridle, then gallops somewhere else to find a place they can say the night. After a while, the horse returns and guides its master to the castle of three fairies, where he works as their servant. With the horse's secret guidance, the boy learns of the fairies' secrets (clothes and nuts in shelves), and their golden bath. One day, the boy stands beneath their golden water, and bathes his hair in it with a golden tint. He then takes the horse and gallops to another kingdom, far away from the fairies, where he finds work as a gardener's assistant to an emperor, when the gardener falls ill, the boy takes bouquets for the emperor' three daughters, the first made of faded flowers, the second with flowers in bloom, and the third with budding flowers. Later, the emperor takes the court to church, and leaves the boy alone in the garden. While the nobles are away, he summons the horse to take a ride around the garden in brass armour - an event seen by the youngest princess -, then goes to church. This happens again with the boy wearing silver and golden amour. Time passes, and the emperor summons a crowd of suitors for the princesses to choose their husbands by throwing a golden apple. The youngest, however, withholds hers until the gardener's assistant passes in front of her. She throws her golden apple to the poor boy, to the king's consternation. He agrees to their marriage, but banishes her to a buffalo pen with the husband. The boy, to alleviate their situation, sumons his horse and orders him to build an underground palace for them. Later, war breaks out, and the boy is given a lame mount to join the war. While he is away, he summons the magic horse and fights three times against his father-in-law's enemies. At the end of the tale, the king goed blind, and, according to an astrologer, only milk from the bird that flies over the Jordan river can cure him. The boy rides the horse and finds the bird's milk, while his brothers-in-law buy a fake remedy from a seller. Finally, the boy goes to the emperor's court and ends his charade.

Romanian historian Nicolae Iorga translated into French a Romanian tale with the title Le Chauve aux Cheveux D'Or ("The Bald [One] With the Golden Hair"). In this tale, a poor couple do not have a son. One day, a hermit appears and gives the wife an apple for her to eat. The same apple is eaten by the couple's mare. The mare foals a young colt and the woman a boy. The colt turns into a horse with "fiery eyes" that belie its hidden magic power, and the boy a youth with peerless strength. One day, they decide to flee from home into the world. At a distance, the horse talks to the youth and gives him a bridle to summon the animal should the need arise. They gallop to a palace of three fairies where the youth works as an ostler. Some time later, the horse confides in him that the youth's fortune lies in the palace: he must wait for the fairies to bathe and be dowsed in their golden water, then take three nuts to hide the fairies' linen robes and run away on the horse. The youth works for the fairies for years until, following the horse's advice, he stands under the fairies shower of gold and gilds his hair with a golden colour. He also takes the fairies' three nuts and flees on the horse. They ride to a distant castle where an emperor lives with his three daughters, the youngest the most beautiful. The horse then advises the youth to hide his golden hair under a cap and to work there as the royal gardener's assistant. Time passes, and the youth, in his new job, arranges bouquets for the three princesses, and places two extravagant flowers in the youngest's. Later, the emperor arranges marriages for his three daughters: the elder two marry foreign princes, but the youngest refuses any of her potential suitors. The story then flashbacks to the time when the imperial family went to church, and the gardener's assistant seized the opportunity to ride his horse around the garden in a copper armor, then in a silver armour, and lastly in a golden armour - events witnessed by the youngest princess, who stayed at the castle. Back to the present, she decides to marry the gardener's assistant, and throws him a golden apple three times. The emperor, her father, agrees to her marriage, but expels her from the castle. Years later, war breaks out, and the emperor's sons-in-law rush to defend the empire, while the bald son-in-law is given a lame mount, but he summons the horse with the bridle and kills the emperor's enemies. Some years pass; the emperor is going blind, and the only cure is milk from the fairies that live beyond the river. The sons-in-law bring him the wrong milk, but the bald one rides his horse, gets the milk and cures his father-in-law.

Writer and folklorist Cristea Sandu Timoc collected a Romanian variant from teller Jovan Ilic and published it with the title Împăratul fără copii ("The Emperor without a Son"). In this tale, a childless emperor longs to have a son. He even tries to find a remedy for his wife, the empress. Fortunately, a hermit appears in the city and offers the solution for the empress: an apple that can grant her the son they have longed for. The empress eats the apple, and its peels are eaten by a mare. The empress gives birth to a son, while the mare foals a colt with a horn on its head. As the boy and the colt grow up, the colt becomes a wild horse that no one can approach, save for the young prince. Some time later, the emperor notices that neither his son, nor the horse are at the stables, for they were taken by the dragons (zmei). The young prince is made to be their servant, while the zmeii lock up the horse in their stables. The young prince feeds the zmeii's horses, and talks to his own. The apple-born animal tells the prince to shave the zmeii and collect some of their blood and beard's hair for them to use in their upcoming escape. The prince follows his horse's advice and brings the blood and hair. He also fetches copper, silver and gold from three fountains, which gilds his hair to a golden colour. The horse advises him to hide his golden hair under a cap so people think he is bald, and lastly to steal a pebble from under the zmeii's bed before they make their escape. With all objects in hand, the prince and his horse ride away to the border of the zmeii's domains, which are alerted by their mare. The zmeii take the mare and chase after the duo, but the horse instructs the prince to throw behind them the pebble (which creates a stone wall), the hairs (which create a forest), and the blood (which creates a sea) to deter the zmeii. At a safe distance, the horse tells the prince to find a job in a castle where an emperor lives with his three daughters, and gives him a bridle so the prince can summon him. The prince finds work as the royal gardener's assistant, and eventually as the royal gardener when the latter retires. One day, when the emperor goes to church with his daughters, but leaves the youngest at home, the prince uses the bridle to summon the horse and tramples the flowers. After the emperor returns, he sees the destroyed garden and admonishes him, who lies that some knights came and trampled the garden - a lie that is corroborated by the third princess. Later, the gardener makes some bouquets for the princesses, the youngest getting the most beautiful. Soon after, the emperor arranges marriages for his daughters: eligible bachelors are to pass by a gazebo where the princesses will stand and will throw an apple to their suitors of choice. The elder princesses throws theirs to princes, while the youngest withholds hers until the gardener passes by them. The princess throws the apple to him, to the emperor's anger, who banishes her to the edge of the realm with her lowly husband. Time passes, and war breaks out, and the emperor's sons-in-law ride into battle to defend the kingdom, while the gardener is given a lame mount. While the emperor is away, the gardener summons his horse with the bridle and fights his father-in-law's enemies, but injures his hand in the process. The emperor dresses his wound with a scarf, and the gardener returns home to his wife. While he rests, the empress pays a visit to her daughter, the third princess, and is surprised that their home is decorated with gold. The princess then tells her mother that her husband has a stash of copper, silver and gold, and the empress insists she comes back to the castle to explain the whole story to the emperor. Following her mother's advice, the princess tells her husband the emperor summoned them, and that the gardener should doff the lowborn disguise. The gardener agrees and lets the princess go ahead of him. He then summons his horse, ditches the cap and rides to the banquet to reveal himself.

See also
The Black Colt
The Magician's Horse
Iron John
The Hairy Man
Little Johnny Sheep-Dung

References

Romanian fairy tales
ATU 300-399